Inhuman Condition is an EP by the American death metal band Massacre. It was released in 1992 by Earache Records.

Track listing 
 "Inhuman Condition" –  5:41
 "Plains of Insanity" – 4:48
 "Warhead" – 5:16 (Venom cover)
 "Provoked Accurser" –  4:53

Credits 
Band members
 Kam Lee – vocals
 Rick Rozz – guitar
 Steve Swanson – guitar on tracks 1–3
 Terry Butler – bass
 Bill Andrews – drums

Guest musicians
 Cronos – additional vocals on track 3
 Walter Trachsler – guitar on track 4

Production
 Rick Miller – engineer
 Edward J. Repka – artwork
Recorded at Morrisound Recording, Tampa, Florida, December 1991

References 

Massacre (metal band) albums
1992 EPs
Albums with cover art by Ed Repka
Earache Records EPs